Ctimene salamandra is a moth of the family Geometridae. It is found in New Guinea.

Subspecies
Ctimene salamandra salamandra
Ctimene salamandra pyrifera (Warren, 1896)

References

Moths described in 1877
Hypochrosini
Moths of New Guinea